Inhulivka (Ukrainian: Інгулівка) is a village in Kherson Raion, within Kherson Oblast, Ukraine. It belongs to Darivka rural hromada, one of the hromadas of Ukraine.

Until 18 July 2020, Inhulivka belonged to Beryslav Raion. As part of the 2020 administrative reform of Ukraine, which reduced the number of raions of Kherson Oblast to five, it was moved into Kherson Raion.

From 25 February 2022, the village was under Russian Occupation. On 11 November armed forces of Ukraine liberated the village.

References

Villages in Kherson Raion